Bruno Smith Nogueira Camargo (born 13 July 1992) is a Brazilian footballer who plays as a midfielder for Águia Negra.

Career

Smith started his career with Brazilian second division side América-RN. After that, Smith joined the youth academy of FC Twente in the Dutch top flight, where he said, "not a very good experience, I was sold at the age of 17 to Twente in the Netherlands, I wasn't prepared for that, I didn't have the family support I should have at that time, I suffered a lot, but nothing with the club, personally."

Before the 2016 season, he signed for Paysandu in the Brazilian third division, where he made 10 appearances and scored 1 goal. On 9 March 2016, Smith debuted for Paysandu during a 1-0 win over Águia de Marabá. On 28 April 2016, he scored his first goal for Paysandu during a 2-1 win over Independente-PA.

In 2020, he signed for Imperatriz in the Brazilian third division. After that, Smith signed for Indonesian team Arema.

References

External links
 
 Bruno Smith at playmakerstats.com

1992 births
Living people
People from Franca
Footballers from São Paulo (state)
Brazilian footballers
Association football midfielders
América Futebol Clube (RN) players
Sport Club Internacional players
Paulista Futebol Clube players
Clube Atlético Penapolense players
Paysandu Sport Club players
Al Ansar FC players
Esporte Clube Águia Negra players
Nova Iguaçu Futebol Clube players
Barretos Esporte Clube players
Vila Nova Futebol Clube players
Sociedade Imperatriz de Desportos players
Arema F.C. players
Campeonato Brasileiro Série B players
Campeonato Brasileiro Série C players
Campeonato Brasileiro Série D players
Lebanese Premier League players
Liga 1 (Indonesia) players
Brazilian expatriate footballers
Brazilian expatriate sportspeople in the Netherlands
Brazilian expatriate sportspeople in Lebanon
Brazilian expatriate sportspeople in Indonesia
Expatriate footballers in the Netherlands
Expatriate footballers in Lebanon
Expatriate footballers in Indonesia